

Walter Sidney Metcalf (18 May 1918 – 25 July 2008) was a New Zealand physical chemist.

Matcalf was born in Kaitangata on 18 May 1918, the son of George Metcalf, and was educated at Napier Boys' High School. He earned a bachelor's degree in music in parallel with his first science degree at the University of Otago, and completed a DPhil degree with E. J. Bowen at England's Oxford University.

Metcalf married Mary Glen Simmers, and the couple went on to thave two children.

Metcalf initially worked at Victoria University College, then moved to Canterbury University College (now the University of Canterbury) in 1954. He retired as a reader in 1975. He worked mainly on photochemistry and was awarded the T. K. Sidey Medal by the Royal Society of New Zealand for his research in 1966. Towards the end of his career, he worked on calcium metabolism.

References

1918 births
2008 deaths
People from Otago
People educated at Napier Boys' High School
Alumni of the University of Oxford
University of Otago alumni
Academic staff of the Victoria University of Wellington
Academic staff of the University of Canterbury
New Zealand chemists
Physical chemists
Photochemists